Tom Waye (28 December 1909 – 10 February 1992) was an Australian rules footballer who played with Port Adelaide in the South Australian National Football League (SANFL) and Footscray in the Victorian Football League (VFL).

Waye played his earliest football in Willunga and Renmark, before arriving in Adelaide and competing in the Port Adelaide Church Association.

He started his Port Adelaide career in 1929, by which time he was also representing the suburb as a district cricketer. On the football field he was used mostly as a follower but when not roving was also seen on the wings and half forward flanks. He was a member of the South Australian interstate team which played in the 1930 Adelaide Carnival.

Off the field he worked as a fitter and turner and moved to Melbourne for employment in 1932. His teammate from Port Adelaide, Les Dayman, had also made his way to Victoria and both signed to play with Footscray.

He polled six Brownlow votes in his first season and in 1934 was Footscray's second leading goal-kicker with 18 goals.

References

1909 births
Australian rules footballers from South Australia
Western Bulldogs players
Port Adelaide Football Club (SANFL) players
Port Adelaide Football Club players (all competitions)
1992 deaths
Southern Football League (South Australia) players
People from Willunga, South Australia